Hancockiidae is a family of sea slugs, nudibranchs, marine gastropod mollusks in the superfamily Tritonioidea.

This family is within the clade Cladobranchia (according to the taxonomy of the Gastropoda by Bouchet & Rocroi, 2005).

Taxonomy 
The family Hancockiidae has no subfamilies and only one genus. It is closely allied to the family Dotidae.

Genera 
The family Hancockiidae has only one valid genus:
 Hancockia, the type genus
 Govia Trinchese, 1885 is considered to be a synonym and its type species Govia rubra Trinchese, 1885 is considered to be a synonym of Hancockia uncinata, type species of the genus Hancockia.

References

 Thompson, T. E., &  Brown, G.H., 1984. Biology of opisthobranch Molluscs. Vol. 2. Ray Society; London. 1-229, p.20